Vanatur, is a former village and a neighborhood within the town of Hrazdan, Kotayk Province, Armenia.

See also 
Kotayk Province

References 

Populated places in Kotayk Province